The 2017 Women's Cricket World Cup in England was contested by eight teams. The top four teams in the 2014–16 ICC Women's Championship qualified automatically, while the other four places in the tournament were filled by the top four teams in the 2017 Women's World Cup Qualifier, a ten-team tournament.

Automatic qualification
The top four teams in the eight-team 2014–16 ICC Women's Championship – Australia, England, New Zealand, and the West Indies – qualified automatically for the 2017 World Cup. The bottom four teams – India, South Africa, Pakistan, and Sri Lanka – qualified for the 2017 World Cup Qualifier.

Regional qualification

Africa
The Africa regional qualifier was held in Harare, Zimbabwe, from 23–26 April 2016, and featured four teams. Twelve matches were played, all of 20-over duration (rather than the 50 overs used at the World Cup). Zimbabwe was the winner, finishing undefeated in its six matches.

Americas
In 2013, the ICC announced that no Americas regional qualifier would be held for the 2017 World Cup, citing the poor quality of women's cricket in the region both in terms of play and administration. Consequently, the West Indies (by virtue of their participation in the ICC Women's Championship) will be the only team from the ICC Americas development region to participate in the qualifying process for the World Cup.

Asia
The Asia regional qualifier was held in Hong Kong from 9–15 October 2016, with matches played at the Mission Road Ground, the Kowloon Cricket Club, and the Hong Kong Cricket Club. Four teams took part, and matches were of 20-over duration.

East Asia-Pacific
The East Asia-Pacific regional qualifier was held in Apia, Samoa, from 15–22 July 2016, and featured three teams. Papua New Guinea was the winner, finishing undefeated in its four matches.

Europe
The Europe regional qualifier was held in Southend-on-Sea, Essex, England, from 12–15 July 2016. Only two teams participated, the Netherlands and Scotland, with Scotland winning all three matches.

World Cup Qualifier

The 2017 World Cup Qualifier was played in Colombo, Sri Lanka, in February 2017.

Qualified teams
  (Bottom 4 of ICC Women's Championship)
  (Bottom 4 of ICC Women's Championship)
  (Bottom 4 of ICC Women's Championship)
  (Bottom 4 of ICC Women's Championship)
  (automatic qualification – ODI status)
  (automatic qualification – ODI status)
  (Africa regional qualifier)
  (Asia regional qualifier)
  (East Asia-Pacific regional qualifier)
  (Europe regional qualifier)

References

International cricket competitions in Samoa
International women's cricket competitions in England
International cricket competitions in Hong Kong
International cricket competitions in Zimbabwe
2017 Women's Cricket World Cup
21st century in Apia